"Simon Says" is the debut single by American rapper Pharoahe Monch. It was released on August 17, 1999, as the lead single from his debut studio album Internal Affairs (1999). "Simon Says" is Monch's most popular song, and samples the theme song of the 1964 film Mothra vs. Godzilla.

Background
The song was released by Rawkus Records in 1999, and peaked at #97 on the Billboard Hot 100. It was also featured in the 2000 films Charlie's Angels and Boiler Room.

In 2001, Pharaohe Monch was sued by Toho for the song's uncleared use of a sample from Akira Ifukube's Gojira Tai Mosura (the theme to Godzilla vs. Mothra) in the hook. As a result, the distribution of Internal Affairs was halted.

Remixes
An official remix of the song appears on Internal Affairs, and features American rappers Lady Luck, Method Man, Redman, Shabaam Sahdeeq and Busta Rhymes.

American rapper Hopsin released his own freestyle to the song on December 26, 2017.

Charts

References

1999 debut singles
1999 songs
Pharoahe Monch songs
Rawkus Records singles
Hardcore hip hop songs